Sak-Lu was the ninth ruler of the Maya city state Copán.

Notes

References

6th-century monarchs in North America
Rulers of Copán
553 deaths
Year of birth missing
6th century in the Maya civilization